Management Information Systems Quarterly,  referred to as MIS Quarterly, is an online-only quarterly peer-reviewed academic journal that covers research in management information systems and information technology. It was established in 1977 and is considered a major periodical in the information systems industry. An official journal of the Association for Information Systems, it is published by the Management Information Systems Research Center at the University of Minnesota. The current editor-in-chief is Andrew Burton-Jones, University of Queensland.

The journal had the highest impact factor (4.978) of all peer-reviewed academic journals in the field of business from 1992–2005. According to the Journal Citation Reports, the journal has a 2015 impact factor of 5.384.

Editors-in-chief
Past editors-in-chief in order of succession have been:

See also 
 Information Systems Research
 Journal of Management Information Systems

References

External links 
 

Business and management journals
Quarterly journals
Information systems journals
English-language journals
Publications established in 1977
University of Minnesota
Academic journals associated with learned and professional societies
Academic journals published by universities and colleges of the United States